Solomonville Road Overpass may refer to:

Solomonville Road Overpass (Clifton, Arizona), listed on the National Register of Historic Places in Greenlee County, Arizona
Solomonville Road Overpass (Safford, Arizona), listed on the National Register of Historic Places in Greenlee County, Arizona